Baz Dreisinger is an American academic, cultural critic and activist. She is a professor of English at City University of New York's John Jay College of Criminal Justice, the founder of the Prison-to-College Pipeline and the executive director of Incarceration Nations Network.

Early life and education
Dreisinger was born in the Bronx, New York. She graduated as the valedictorian of her class from Queens College, City University of New York, where she earned a bachelor's degree in English in 1997. She attended Columbia University for graduate school, where she earned a Ph.D. in English with a specialty in African-American studies in 2002. Her Ph.D. dissertation became her first book: Near Black: White-to-Black Passing in American Culture.

Career
Dreisinger  is a tenured professor of English at CUNY's John Jay College of Criminal Justice, where she is also the Founder of the Prison-to-College Pipeline program. The program, founded in 2011, offers incarcerated men throughout New York State a way to increase their higher education options and advocates for higher education access for those incarcerated and formerly so.

Published Works 
Dreisinger is the author of Near Black: White to Black Passing in American Culture and Incarceration Nations: A Journey to Justice in Prisons Around the World, which she wrote after traveling to nine countries to reimagine modern carceral systems. The book offers a radical rethinking of one of America's most devastating exports and national experiments–the modern prison system–and was named a Notable Book of 2016 by the Washington Post; it was also lauded by The New York Times, NPR, the LA Times and many more. Dr. Dreisinger was named a 2018 Global Fulbright Scholar for her work promoting education and restorative justice internationally; she is currently a Fulbright Specialist Scholar, with planned work in Australia, South Africa, Jamaica and Trinidad.

Incarceration Nations Network & The Writing On The Wall 
In 2019, Dr. Dreisinger launched Incarceration Nations Network (INN), a global network that supports, instigates and popularizes innovative prison reform and justice reimagining efforts around the world. INN has 127 global partners and has built a multimedia web platform to showcase transnational justice and prison reform work. INN also coordinates global gatherings and virtual events and produced the film project Incarceration Nations: A Global Docuseries, a ten-episode documentary series about global mass incarceration, told entirely by those with lived experience of the justice system worldwide. Dreisinger directed the series, which had its world premiere at the 2021 Tribeca Film Festival and has since been touring the world led by INN partners. Together with conceptual artist Hank Willis Thomas, Dreisinger and INN have collaborated to create the traveling exhibition and installation The Writing On The Wall (TWOTW), constructed from over 2,000 pages of writing and art by incarcerated and formerly incarcerated people across the world. In its most elaborate showing, TWOTW was displayed on New York City's High Line; throughout the COVID-19 pandemic the collaborators adapted the content to be projected onto city buildings and landscapes, including jails and courthouses from New York and Washington D.C. to Mexico City, La Paz, Bolivia, and Santiago, Chile. The Writing on the Wall's latest iteration is as a global microfinance project for people coming home from prison, whose small businesses are decked out in TWOTW branding and thus serve to battle stigma against formerly incarcerated people. The Writing on the Wall as Enterprise, as the project is known, launched in Thailand (as a food cart) and Prague (as a restaurant) and is also opening businesses in Colombia, Trinidad, Jamaica, Kenya, Argentina and South Africa.

In 2022 INN launched the Global Freedom Fellowship, which annually brings 15 formerly incarcerated leaders from around the world to South Africa, to engage in transnational movement building.

Journalism 
Dreisinger writes about Caribbean culture, race-related issues, music, pop culture and travel for The New York Times, The Wall Street Journal and Forbes Life. She also writes and produces on-air pieces for NPR’s All Things Considered. She wrote and produced the documentaries “Black & Blue: Legends of the Hip-Hop Cop” and “Rhyme & Punishment.”

Awards and honors 
Dreisinger, the recipient of a Whiting Fellowship, is a Ford Foundation Art for Justice grantee (together with the visual artist Hank Willis Thomas) and in 2014 received the Marcia Vickery-Wallace award. In 2022 she was named the Senior Advisor for Global Initiatives at the Bard Prison Initiative (BPI); via this role INN was able to partner with BPI and Open Society University Network to support prison-university partnerships in nearly a dozen countries.

References

Year of birth missing (living people)
Living people
Queens College, City University of New York alumni
Columbia Graduate School of Arts and Sciences alumni
John Jay College of Criminal Justice faculty
American women academics
21st-century American women